Brocciu is a Corsican cheese produced from a combination of milk and whey, giving it some of the characteristics of whey cheese. It is produced from ewe's milk. It is notable as a substitute for lactose-rich Italian Ricotta, as brocciu contains less lactose.
 
Produced on the island of Corsica, brocciu is considered the island's most representative food. Like ricotta, it is a young white cheese and is paired frequently with Corsican white wines. It has been described as "the most famous cheese" in Corsica.

The word brocciu is related to the French word brousse and means fresh cheese made with goat or ewe's milk.

Brocciu is made from whey and milk. First, the whey is heated to a low temperature of just a few degrees below  and then ewe's milk is added and further heated to just a bit below . After heating, the cheese is drained in rush baskets.

The cheese is ready for consumption immediately, although it may be ripened for a few weeks ( or brocciu vechju); the ideal affinage time for brocciu is 48 hours to one month.

In Corsican cuisine, it is used in the preparation of innumerable dishes, from first courses to desserts.

See also
 List of cheeses

Notes

References

Whey cheeses
Sheep's-milk cheeses
French cheeses
Corsican cuisine
French products with protected designation of origin
Cheeses with designation of origin protected in the European Union